The 1898–99 Ottawa Hockey Club season was the club's 14th season of play. Ottawa placed third in the league.

Team business 
The rival Ottawa Capitals applied to join the Amateur Hockey Association of Canada (AHAC). When the AHAC league accepted the Capitals, Ottawa, along with Montreal, Quebec and Victorias left the AHAC. The clubs would form the Canadian Amateur Hockey League (CAHL) along with the Montreal Shamrocks.

Season 
The future Hall of Fame brothers Hod and Bruce Stuart made their debuts for Ottawa this season. Harvey Pulford did not play this season, recovering from a collarbone injury sustained in the Canadian football championship game. Chauncy Kirby would return to captain the team in his place.

Highlights 
A controversy erupted between goaltender Fred Chittick and the Ottawa club, prompting accusations that Chittick was a "shamateur" receiving payment to play. Bouse Hutton would replace Chittick in net, starting on February 18, after Chittick gave up 16 goals in a game on February 11. Chittick attempted to score by himself, rushing the length of the ice from his net, without success.

Final standing

Schedule and results 

‡ defaulted to Ottawa

Player statistics

Goaltending averages

Scoring Leaders

Awards and records

Transactions

Roster

See also 

 1899 CAHL season

References 

 

Ottawa Senators (original) seasons
Ottawa